Immaculata High School may refer to:
Immaculata Regional High School, in Kelowna, British Columbia, Canada
Immaculata High School (Ottawa), in Ottawa, Ontario, Canada
Immaculata High School (Chicago), in Chicago, Illinois, United States
Immaculata High School (Kansas), in Leavenworth, Kansas, United States
Immaculata High School (Marrero, Louisiana), in Marrero, Louisiana, United States
Immaculata High School (Detroit, Michigan)
Immaculata High School (New Jersey), in Somerville, New Jersey, United States
Immaculata High School (Washington, D.C.), in the District of Columbia, United States

See also
Immaculata (disambiguation)
Immaculate High School, Danbury, Connecticut, United States